Joaquín Eduardo Torres (born 28 January 1997) is an Argentine professional footballer who plays as a winger for Major League Soccer club Philadelphia Union.

Career
Torres began his youth career with ACDC Patagonia, prior to signing for Newell's Old Boys in 2010. His senior career started in 2015 with Argentine Primera División side Newell's. He made his professional debut during the 2015 campaign, playing the final twelve minutes of a 2–0 defeat to Belgrano. He made another two appearances in all competitions across 2016, but he didn't feature in the 2016–17 season. In 2017–18, Torres scored his first senior goal in his second start against Olimpo on 16 September. On 26 August 2019, newly-promoted Super League Greece side Volos announced the arrival of Torres; a first move abroad.

Torres netted four goals in as many games to start his Volos career, notably scoring a brace over Atromitos on 6 October. Torres scored again on 30 November during a 2–1 away loss against AEL. He returned to Newell's in June 2020, having appeared twenty-seven times for Volos. On 1 February 2021, Torres renewed his contract with Newell's until December 2022. He was immediately loaned out to Major League Soccer with CF Montréal. On 21 October 2021, Montréal exercised their option to make Torres' move permanent.

On 26 January 2023, Torres was traded to Philadelphia Union in exchange for $500,000 in General Allocation Money, with potential for that fee to rise to $800,000.

Career statistics

Honours
CF Montreal
Canadian Championship: 2021

References

External links

1997 births
Living people
People from Neuquén
Argentine footballers
Association football midfielders
Argentine expatriate footballers
Expatriate footballers in Greece
Expatriate soccer players in Canada
Expatriate soccer players in the United States
Argentine expatriate sportspeople in Greece
Argentine expatriate sportspeople in Canada
Argentine expatriate sportspeople in the United States
Argentine Primera División players
Super League Greece players
Newell's Old Boys footballers
Volos N.F.C. players
CF Montréal players
Philadelphia Union players
Major League Soccer players